Pleurocoronis is a genus of North American shrubs or subshrubs native to the southwestern United States and northwestern Mexico.  It is in the tribe Eupatorieae within the family Asteraceae. All known members had been considered members of the related genus Hofmeisteria before being moved to Pleurocoronis.

 Species
 Pleurocoronis gentryi (Wiggins) R.M.King & H.Rob. - Baja California, Baja California Sur
 Pleurocoronis laphamioides (Rose) R.M.King & H.Rob. - Baja California, Baja California Sur, Sonora
 Pleurocoronis pluriseta (A.Gray) R.M.King & H.Rob. - California, Nevada, Arizona, Utah, Baja California, Baja California Sur, Sonora

References

External links
 
 Pleurocoronis pluriseta. CalPhotos
 Pleurocoronis pluriseta. The Jepson Manual
 Pleurocoronis pluriseta. CalFlora

Eupatorieae
Asteraceae genera
Flora of North America